Orinympha is a genus of moths of the family Yponomeutidae.

Species
Orinympha aetherias - Meyrick, 1927 

Yponomeutidae